7 Lives is a 2011 British fantasy drama film directed by Paul Wilkins and starring Danny Dyer, Kate Ashfield and Martin Compston.

The film revolves around a working-class blue collar who finds himself in a body-swapping odyssey after an ambush by a group of hoodies. His quest to reunite with the empty shell of himself leads to tragic consequences but also show him the errors on his life.

Plot
Tom, a married family man, is struggling at work when a client tries to seduce him with promises of a 'more exciting life'. On his way home one night, he gets attacked by a gang of hoodies and falls into a parallel world where he lives 5 other lives including that of a rock star, a homeless person and the 'hoody' that attacked him. These lives help him to re-evaluate his priorities and values but in order to get home he must face some of his deepest desires and fears. Will he make it home or is the grass greener on the other side?

Cast
 Danny Dyer as Tom
 Kate Ashfield as Cynthia
 Nick Brimble as Ted
 Martin Compston as Rory, The Rockstar
 Craig Conway as Keith
 Michael Elwyn as Brian
Helen George as Valerie
 Tom Goodman-Hill as Peter
 Julien Ball as Doctor
 Theo Barklem-Biggs as Kid

Critical reception
GASHE.com gave the film a rating of 2 1/2 stars saying, "While the plot is dark and uncomfortable at times, it moves along at a decent pace and the unique use of different lead actors for each story works."

Release
The film was released on 7 October 2011. The film was released on DVD and Blu-ray on 10 October 2011.

References

External links
 
 
 7lives at Starfish Films

2011 films
British fantasy drama films
2010s English-language films
2010s fantasy drama films
2010s British films